The 2015–16 Copa del Rey de Rugby was the 83rd edition of this tournament. SilverStorm El Salvador defeated local rival VRAC Quesos Entrepinares in the final of the tournament. This game beat the attendance record for a rugby union game in Spain with 26,500 spectators. King Felipe VI of Spain attended to the game.

Competition format
This edition was featured top seven teams at the end of the first half (round 11) of the 2015–16 División de Honor de Rugby. UE Santboiana declined to play.

All rounds were played with a single game format.

Calendar

Quarter-finals
Draw was held on 14 December 2015 at Spanish Rugby Federation headquarters. Top seeded team, VRAC Quesos Entrepinares, received a bye to Semifinals.

Matches played on 10 January 2016.

|}

Semifinals
Draw took place on 11 January 2016 at Spanish Rugby Federation headquarters. Draw included three winners from Quarter-finals plus top-seed, VRAC Quesos Entrepinares.

Matches to be played on 31 January 2016.

|}

Matches

Final
The match was marked for an attendance-record (26,500) in a rugby match in Spain.

References

2015–16
2015–16 in Spanish rugby union
2015–16 rugby union tournaments for clubs